Alexandra Harrington is an international jurist in human rights, environmental and climate change law, and both a Professor of Law at Albany Law School and Assistant Director of the Global Institute for Health and Human Rights. In addition, Harrington is Director of Studies for the International Law Association of Colombia, a member of the ILA Committee on the Role of International Law in Sustainable Natural Resource Management for Development, and is Lead Counsel for Peace, Justice and Governance at the Centre for International Sustainable Development Law.

Education
Harrington completed her undergraduate studies at New York University, moving on to complete both a Juris Doctor and a Master of Law from Albany Law School, and a Doctor of Civil Law from McGill University Faculty of Law.

Professional career
Harrington began her academic tenure as an associate professor at Albany Law School in 2011. Harrington is an adjunct professor in the Faculty of Law, as well as an affiliated faculty and 
assistant director of the Global Institute for Health and Human Rights.

In addition to being director of studies for the International Law Association of Colombia  and a member (affiliate) of the International Law Association Committee on the Role of International Law in Sustainable Natural Resource Management for Development, Harrington is an expert for the International Centre for Trade and Sustainable Development, and has previously consulted for the  Commission for Environmental Cooperation of the North American Agreement on Environmental Cooperation. 
  
Harrington also serves as Lead Counsel for Peace, Justice and Governance at the Centre for International Sustainable Development Law and is a member of the board of governors.

In 2018 Harrington was awarded Fulbright Canada Research Chair in Global Governance, conducting her research on the role of treaty regimes in global governance at the Balsillie School of International Affairs in Waterloo, Canada.

Publications
Harrington has edited or contributed to over 40 peer-reviewed publications and policy reports. 
Representative publications include:
 International Organizations and the Law (Routledge, 2018)
 A Complex System of International Courts and Tribunals in Marie-Claire Cordonier Segger, HE Judge Christopher Weeramantry eds.,Sustainable Development in International Courts and Tribunals (Routledge, 2017), with Cairo Robb.
 The Crime of Aggression and New Environmental and Socio-Economic Harms in Sébastien Jodoin, Marie-Claire Cordonier Segger, eds., Sustainable Development, International Criminal Justice, and Treaty Implementation (Cambridge University Press, 2013).
 Climate Change and Sustainable Energy Measures in Regional Trade Agreements (RTAs): An Overview (ICTSD, Issue Paper No.3 2013), with Markus W. Gehring, Marie-Claire Cordonier Segger, Fabiano de Andrade Correa, Patrick Reynaud, and Rodrigo Mella
 Harrington, Alexandra R. (2005) "Courthouses, Bookshelves, and Portals: The Implications of U.S. v. American Library Association on First Amendment Forum Analysis and Future Internet-Based Litigation Strategies," Oklahoma Journal of Law and Technology: Vol. 2 : No. 1, Article 14.

References

External links

Living people
New York University alumni
Albany Law School alumni
Year of birth missing (living people)
McGill University Faculty of Law alumni